Cirrhimuraena chinensis is an eel in the family Ophichthidae (worm/snake eels). It was described by Johann Jakob Kaup in 1856. It is a tropical, marine eel which is known from China and Papua New Guinea, in the western Pacific Ocean. Males can reach a maximum standard length of 54.8 centimetres.

References

Ophichthidae
Taxa named by Johann Jakob Kaup
Fish described in 1856